Aurora Genoveva Delgado Vergara (born in 1964) is a Chilean politician who was elected as a member of the Chilean Constitutional Convention.

References

External links
 

Living people
21st-century Chilean politicians
Democratic Revolution politicians
Members of the Chilean Constitutional Convention
Austral University of Chile alumni
21st-century Chilean women politicians
1964 births